Napamus is a genus of braconid wasps in the family Braconidae. There are at least two described species in Napamus, found in the Palearctic. Recently, all the information related to genus was published.

Species
These two species belong to the genus Napamus:
 Napamus vipio (Reinhard, 1880)
 Napamus zomborii Papp, 1993

References

Microgastrinae